is a Japanese pianist.

She won the first international edition of the Paloma O'Shea Santander International Piano Competition (Spain, 1974) and shared the 1980 Concorso Busoni 2nd prize with Rolf Plagge and Hai-Kyung Suh (no 1st prize was awarded). She taught at the Osaka College of Music.

References

  Northport Art Coalition
  Biblioteca Virtual Miguel de Cervantes - Fundación Albéniz

Year of birth missing (living people)
Japanese classical pianists
Japanese women pianists
Living people
Prize-winners of the Ferruccio Busoni International Piano Competition
Prize-winners of the Paloma O'Shea International Piano Competition
Women classical pianists
21st-century classical pianists
21st-century Japanese women musicians
Academic staff of Osaka College of Music
20th-century classical pianists
20th-century Japanese women musicians
20th-century Japanese pianists
21st-century Japanese pianists
20th-century women pianists
21st-century women pianists